The 1994 Malaysian motorcycle Grand Prix was the second round of the 1994 Grand Prix motorcycle racing season. It took place on the weekend of 10 April 1994 at the Shah Alam Circuit.

500 cc classification

250 cc classification

125 cc classification

References

Malaysian motorcycle Grand Prix
Malaysian
Motorcycle Grand Prix